Janne Hyppönen (born 14 September 1970 in Vehkalahti) is a top Finnish football manager and former player.

He has previously coached Veikkausliiga club Myllykosken Pallo and is currently the coach of FC KooTeePee.

References

Finnish football managers
Finnish footballers
1970 births
Living people
Myllykosken Pallo −47 managers
Association football forwards